Ekaterina Olegovna Efimova (born 3 July 1993) is a Russian volleyball player for Leningradka Saint Petersburg and the Russian national team.

She participated at the 2017 Women's European Volleyball Championship. and 2018 FIVB Volleyball Women's Nations League.

National team 
 2019 World Cup -  Bronze medal (with Russia)

Clubs
  Zarechye Odintsovo (2014–2015)
  Omichka Omsk (oct 2015–dec 2015)
  Dinamo Krasnodar (2015–2016)
  Yenisey Krasnoyarsk (2016–2018)
  WVC Dynamo Moscow (2018–2021)
  Leningradka Saint Petersburg (2021–)

References

1993 births
Living people
Russian women's volleyball players
20th-century Russian women
21st-century Russian women